Jo-Wilfried Tsonga was the defending champion, but he was defeated in the semifinals by countryman Julien Benneteau 7–6(13–11), 5–7, 7–6(7–3).

Michaël Llodra won in the final 6–3, 6–4, against Julien Benneteau.

Seeds
The top four seeds receive a bye into the second round.

Draw

Finals

Top half

Bottom half

Qualifying

Seeds

Qualifiers

Lucky loser

Draw

First qualifier

Second qualifier

Third qualifier

Fourth qualifier

External links
Main Draw
Qualifying Draw

Open 13
Open 13 - Singles